Meet the Wife refers to:

 Meet the Wife (play), 1923 Broadway play
 Meet the Wife (film), 1931 American film
 Meet the Wife (TV series), British TV series